Henry William Newman (27 November 1839 – 1 June 1904) was a French-born Australian politician.

He was born at Nantes in France to Robert William Newman, the British Vice-Consul at Nantes, and Adelaide Heseltine. The family migrated to Sydney in 1841 and he attended Sydney Grammar School. He briefly studied law and went to the gold rush, failing at Forbes and having some success at Lucknow with the "Homeward Bound" claim, but lost all his money going into business in Lucknow. He spent four years as a mining labourer at Grenfell and a stint as a newspaper reporter at Forest Reefs (near Cadia), before returning to Lucknow and purchasing the main storekeeping business there. The second Lucknow business was very successful, and he subsequently went into mining ownership, purchasing his first mine, the "Uncle Tom", in 1878. His interests at Lucknow were partially attributed with the revival of the town, and he continued to acquire mining interests, with interests all over New South Wales and in Queensland, South Australia and New Zealand by the time of his death. He was heavily involved in local organisations in Lucknow and Orange, was a generous benefactor to local causes and having himself experienced poverty, was known for paying "the highest current rate of wages" in his mines. He was married three times and had ten children.

In 1891 he was elected to the New South Wales Legislative Assembly as the member for Orange, with joint Labor and Free Trade endorsement. Although initially sitting as a Labor member, he refused to take the pledge and by 1894 was a Free Trader. He held the seat until his death in 1904 from heart disease at Lucknow.

References

 

1839 births
1904 deaths
Members of the New South Wales Legislative Assembly
Australian Labor Party members of the Parliament of New South Wales
Free Trade Party politicians
19th-century Australian politicians